Calvatia sporocristata is a species of puffball in the family Agaricaceae. Found in Costa Rica, it was described as new to science in 2003 by Spanish mycologist Francisco D. Calonge. The outermost tissue layer, the exoperidium, is brown and has a cork-like texture; the endoperidium is thin and paperlike. Inside the puffball, the gleba is initially yellowish-brown before changing to dark brown and woolly as the spores mature. The specific epithet sporocristata refers to the crest-forming spines on the spores. Similar Calvatia species include C. lepidophara and C. longicauda, but these lookalikes can be readily distinguished from C. sporocristata by differences in spore ornamentation.

References

External links

Agaricaceae
Fungi described in 2003
Fungi of Central America